William Dobson (4 March 1611 (baptised); 28 October 1646 (buried)) was a portraitist and one of the first significant English painters, praised by his contemporary John Aubrey as "the most excellent painter that England has yet bred". He died relatively young and his final years were disrupted by the English Civil War.

Biography 

Dobson was born in London, the son of a lawyer also called William Dobson. He was baptised at St Andrew's Holborn. He was apprenticed to William Peake and probably later joined the studio of Francis Cleyn. There is a claim that his father was a decorative artist, but this may be a misreading of the single known quote about Dobson Sr, by the antiquarian John Aubrey. Dobson is believed to have had access to the Royal Collection and to have copied works by Titian and Anthony van Dyck, the court painter of King Charles I of England. The colour and texture of Dobson's work was influenced by Venetian art, but Van Dyck's style had little apparent influence on Dobson. The story that Van Dyck himself discovered Dobson when he noticed one of the young artist's pictures in a London shop window is not supported by any evidence, nor do we know how he gained his introduction to the King, who had Dobson paint himself, his sons and members of the court.

Little is known of Dobson's career in the 1630s, but when Van Dyck died in 1641, the opportunity arose for him to gain royal commissions from King Charles. He is said to have become serjeant painter to the king and groom of the privy chamber. However, this claim comes from only one old and as yet unverified source. During the English Civil War Dobson was based at the Royalist centre of Oxford and painted many leading Cavaliers. His portrait of the future Charles II as Prince of Wales at the age of around twelve is a notable baroque composition, and perhaps his finest work. He also painted at least the head of Duke of York, as well as portraits of leading Royalists such as Charles Lucas and John Byron, 1st Baron Byron, Prince Rupert of the Rhine and Prince Maurice.

Works 

Around sixty of Dobson's works survive, mostly half-length portraits dating from 1642 or later. The thick impasto of his early work gave way to a mere skim of paint, perhaps reflecting a wartime scarcity of materials. After Oxford fell to the Parliamentarians, in June 1646, Dobson returned to London. Now without patronage, he was briefly imprisoned for debt and died in poverty at the age of thirty-five.

Ellis Waterhouse described Dobson as "the most distinguished purely British painter before Hogarth", and in the view of Waldemar Januszczak he was "the first British born genius, the first truly dazzling English painter".

There are examples of Dobson's work at the National Gallery, the National Gallery of Scotland, Tate Britain, the National Portrait Gallery, the National Maritime Museum, Queen's House in Greenwich, the Walker Art Gallery in Liverpool, the Ferens Art Gallery in Hull, the Courtauld Institute of Art, the Dulwich Picture Gallery in London, in several English country houses including notably Alnwick Castle where Dobson's self-portrait with Nicholas Lanier and Charles Cotterell is displayed, and at the Dunedin Public Art Gallery in New Zealand.

The 2011 anniversary of his birth was marked by exhibitions, a 'Dobson Trail' listing his paintings on a website, and a BBC television profile by Januszczak, The Lost Genius of British Art: William Dobson.

Personal life 

He was married twice, first to Elizabeth, whose surname is unknown, as is the date of their marriage. She was buried in St Martin-in-the-Fields on 26 September 1634. On 18 December 1637 he married Judith Sander, who survived him.

References

Further reading 

 John Aubrey, Brief Lives.
 Waldemar Januszczak, The first great British painter?, Tate, 17, Spring 1999, p. 62.
 R. F. Jones, William Dobson: The King's Painter, Tyger's Head Books, 2016
 Malcolm Rogers, William Dobson, 1611–46: The Royalists at War, National Portrait Gallery Exhibition Catalogue, 1983.

External links 

 
 United Kingdom National Portrait Gallery — William Dobson
 Tate Collection — William Dobson
 William Dobson 1611-1646, Biography, Paintings, Dobson Art Trail

1611 births
1646 deaths
17th-century English painters
Court painters
English male painters
English portrait painters
Painters from London
People imprisoned for debt